Giuliano Carer Rocco (born 18 April 1993 in São Paulo) is a Brazilian competitive swimmer.

In 2011 Pan American Games, won the silver medal in the 4×200-metre freestyle, by participating in the qualifying race. Also ranked 11th in the 400-metre freestyle.

References

External links 
 

1993 births
Living people
Swimmers from São Paulo
Brazilian male freestyle swimmers
Swimmers at the 2011 Pan American Games
Pan American Games silver medalists for Brazil
Pan American Games medalists in swimming
Medalists at the 2011 Pan American Games
21st-century Brazilian people